This list of Mensans contains notable members of Mensa International, the high IQ society, both current and past.

A

 Scott Adams – cartoonist, creator of Dilbert, former member
 Simon Ambrose – winner of Britain's Apprentice television show
Arlan Andrews – American engineer, writer of science fiction and non-fiction
 Isaac Asimov – prolific author, former vice-president of Mensa International
 Jean Auel – author of The Clan of the Cave Bear
 Yank Azman – actor, antiques expert
 Amelia Henderson – actor, antiques expert

B

 Paul Bechly – American chemical engineer 
 Jacques Bergier – chemical engineer, member of the French resistance, spy, journalist and writer 
 Roland Berrill – lawyer, businessman and co-founder of Mensa
 Theodore Bikel – actor, musician
 Richard Bolles – self-help author
 Laurie Brokenshire – Royal Naval officer, magician and world-class puzzle solver
 Cyril Burt – educational psychologist, developer of factor analysis in psychological testing
 Eileen Rose Busby – antiques expert

C

 Mike Carona – former Sheriff-Coroner of Orange County, California
 Asia Carrera – former pornographic actress and blogger
 Leslie Charteris – writer and author of The Saint novels, featuring Simon Templar and Christopher R S Casson, England 
 Chino XL – rapper (born Derek Keith Barbosa)
 Marshall Christmann – Former member of the Kansas House of Representatives and a current Kansas Judge, Labor Union Negotiator, City Councilman, and Mediator 
 Jack Cohen – reproductive biologist and popular science writer
 Martin Cooper – considered the inventor of the mobile phone
 Adrian Cronauer – real-life inspiration for the movie Good Morning, Vietnam
 Bobby Czyz – boxer, former two-time World Boxing Association Cruiserweight Champion

D

 Aaron Dai – pianist, composer, architect
 Geena Davis – Academy Award-winning actress
Adragon De Mello – American college graduate at age 11
 C. J. de Mooi – competitive chess player, quiz show champion, and Egghead
 Nelson DeMille – author of Night Fall
 Lucas di Grassi – Brazilian racing driver
 Viacheslav Dinerchtein – concert violist
 Doda – Polish pop singer (born Dorota Rabczewska)
 Emma Dumont – American actress, model and dancer

E

F

 Leon Feingold – athlete, pitcher for Cleveland Indians and Israel Baseball League
 Brian J. Ford – biologist
 Stephen Fry – actor, writer
 Ernestine Fu – venture capitalist
 Buckminster Fuller – designer, architect, poet, author, inventor, second President of Mensa

G

 Antonella Gambotto-Burke – Australian author and journalist
 Rolf Gindorf – German sexologist and gay activist
 Tilman Goins – American politician, Tennessee House of Representatives
 Nolan Gould – American actor, Modern Family

H

 Chris Hadfield – retired Canadian astronaut, served as commander of the International Space Station
 Jeremy Hanley – former Chairman of the Conservative Party in England
 Kara Hayward – actress, starred in the 2012 movie Moonrise Kingdom
 Glenne Headly – Emmy-nominated actress
 Tom Herman – former Texas Longhorns Football head coach
 Alfred George Hinds – British criminal and prison escape artist who later used his legal knowledge to obtain a full pardon
 Ha Yeon-joo – South Korean actress

I

 Charles Ingram – novelist and quiz show cheat
 Lucy Irvine – author of Castaway

J

 Kym Jackson – Australian actress
 Bella Jarrett – American actress, novelist

K

 Yūka Kageyama, Japanese singer and television presenter
 Maurice Kanbar – creator of SKYY vodka and inventor
 William H. Keith Jr. – science fiction author, sci-fi games designer and illustrator
 Kotori Koiwai – Japanese voice actress, lyricist, composer
Grover Krantz – American biological anthropologist
 Erik Kuselias – ESPN radio and television personality

L

 Bernie LaBarge – musician
 Mell Lazarus – cartoonist, creator of comic strips Miss Peach and Momma
 Richard Lederer – author of books on word play
 Jamie Loftus – comedian, writer, and animator, created the podcast "My Year In Mensa" 
 Ranan Lurie – editorial cartoonist and journalist

M
 
Andrzej Majewski – writer, aphorist, and photographer
 John McAfee – computer programmer, founder of McAfee, Inc., one of the first people to design anti-virus software
 Janet McDonald – lawyer and author of African American young adult novels
 Alan McFarland – former MLA for North Down, United Kingdom
 Henry Milligan – boxer and scholar, 1983 US National Amateur Heavyweight champion
 Gert Mittring – mental calculator
 Regan Mizrahi – child actor, won 2011 Young Artist Award for the voice of Boots in Dora the Explorer
 Roger Moreira – Brazilian musician, member of Ultraje a Rigor
 Ellen Morphonios – Florida judge
 Michael Muhney – actor in Veronica Mars and The Young and the Restless
 Ellen Muth – actress in Dolores Claiborne and Dead Like Me

N

Barry Nolan – Says You! panelist

O

 Joyce Carol Oates – author of The Gravedigger's Daughter
 Brendan O'Carroll – Irish comedian
 Adam Osborne – computer designer, software publisher, creator of the Osborne 1

P

 Park Kyung – South Korean rapper
 Gareth Penn – author and private investigator
 Markus Persson – Creator and developer of Minecraft
 Donald Petersen – former CEO of the Ford Motor Company
 Julie Peterson – Playboy Playmate of the Month, February 1987
 Uroš Petrović – Serbian author, President of Serbian Mensa
 Nicky Piper – boxer
 Madsen Pirie – philosopher and economist
Robert Prechter – American financial author and stock market analyst

Q

R

 Alan Rachins – actor on L.A. Law and Dharma & Greg
 Raven – professional wrestler (born Scott Levy)
 Ashley Rickards – actress
 Radoslav Rochallyi – Slovak philosopher, writer and poet
Ginny Ruffner – American glass artist

S
 Jimmy Savile – English DJ, television/radio personality and serial sex offender
 Norman Schwarzkopf, Jr. – US Army General, planner of Operation Desert Storm
 Margot Seitelman – first executive director of American Mensa
 Victor Serebriakoff – author and former international president of Mensa
 Alexander Shulgin – medicinal chemist, biochemist, and rediscoverer of MDMA (ecstasy)
 Clive Sinclair – inventor of the Sinclair Executive pocket calculator, founder of Sinclair Research, member of British Mensa, and Chairman from 1980 to 1997
 Scott Sonnon – public speaker and celebrity fitness coach
 Katariina Souri – Finnish writer, singer and Playboy Playmate of the Month for December 1988
 E. Lee Spence – shipwreck expert, pioneer underwater archaeologist and discoverer of the H.L. Hunley submarine
 Peter A. Sturgeon – founder of American Mensa, medical writer, brother of Theodore Sturgeon

T

 Ruben Talberg – Israeli-German sculptor

U

V

 Carol Vorderman – British television presenter
 Marilyn vos Savant – last person listed in the Guinness Book of World Records under "Highest IQ" (category has been withdrawn)

W
 David Warburton – MP, composer and entrepreneur
 Lancelot Ware – barrister, biochemist, and co-founder of Mensa

X

Y

Z
 Roger Zelazny – American writer

References

Giftedness
 
Lists of people by avocation